Yarrow Point is a town in King County, Washington, United States. The population was 1,001 at the 2010 census.

Based on per capita income, one of the more reliable measures of affluence, Yarrow Point ranks fifth of 522 areas in the state of Washington to be ranked.

History
Before the arrival of settlers the Duwamish set up two longhouses along Yarrow Bay, although most of the tribe lived in the area occupied by the present day cities of Renton and Seattle. The town was named by newspaper publisher Leigh S. J. Hunt, who lived there from 1886 to 1895, after the Yarrow flower. Yarrow Point was officially incorporated on June 15, 1959.

Geography
Yarrow Point occupies a peninsula near the eastern edge of Lake Washington, lying between the lake's Cozy Cove and Yarrow Bay and nearly all of it north of Washington State Route 520. It is bordered by Hunts Point on the west, Clyde Hill on the south, and by Kirkland on the east.

Politics

On the national level, Yarrow Point previously leaned toward the Republican Party. In 2004, Republican George W. Bush received 52 percent of the vote here, defeating Democrat John Kerry, who received around 47 percent. However, in the 2016 presidential election, of the 694 residents who voted, 58.93% voted for Hillary Clinton and 29.83% for Donald Trump.

Demographics

2010 census
As of the census of 2010, there were 1,001 people, 374 households, and 299 families living in the town. The racial makeup of the town was 86.4% White, 0.1% African American, 0.2% Native American, 8.8% Asian, 0.7% from other races, and 3.8% from two or more races. Hispanic or Latino of any race were 1.6% of the population.

There were 374 households, of which 39.8% had children under the age of 18 living with them, 72.5% were married couples living together, 5.6% had a female householder with no husband present, 1.9% had a male householder with no wife present, and 20.1% were non-families. 17.4% of all households were made up of individuals, and 10.4% had someone living alone who was 65 years of age or older. The average household size was 2.68 and the average family size was 3.04.

The median age in the town was 46.8 years. 27.7% of residents were under the age of 18; 3.6% were between the ages of 18 and 24; 15.7% were from 25 to 44; 33.5% were from 45 to 64; and 19.6% were 65 years of age or older. The gender makeup of the town was 49.6% male and 50.4% female.

2000 census
As of the census of 2000, there were 1,008 people, 379 households, and 308 families living in the town. The population density was 2,720.3 people per square mile (1,051.9/km2). There were 393 housing units at an average density of 1,060.6 per square mile (410.1/km2). The racial makeup of the town was 93.65% White, 0.79% African American, 3.17% Asian, 0.69% from other races, and 1.69% from two or more races. Hispanic or Latino of any race were 1.98% of the population.

There were 379 households, out of which 34.6% had children under the age of 18 living with them, 78.4% were married couples living together, 1.6% had a female householder with no husband present, and 18.5% were non-families. 15.3% of all households were made up of individuals, and 7.7% had someone living alone who was 65 years of age or older. The average household size was 2.66 and the average family size was 2.96.

In the town, the population was spread out, with 25.9% under the age of 18, 3.7% from 18 to 24, 20.9% from 25 to 44, 30.9% from 45 to 64, and 18.7% who were 65 years of age or older. The median age was 45 years. For every 100 females, there were 102.0 males. For every 100 females age 18 and over, there were 95.5 males.

The median income for a household in the town was $117,940, and the median income for a family was $126,075. Males had a median income of $100,000 versus $52,500 for females. The per capita income for the town was $72,135. About 1.6% of families and 3.4% of the population were below the poverty line, including 6.4% of those under age 18 and none of those age 65 or over.

Education
The city is in the Bellevue School District.

Residents are zoned to: Clyde Hill Elementary School, Chinook Middle School, and Bellevue High School.

Notable people
Chris Ballew, musician

Gallery

References

External links
 Town of Yarrow Point

Towns in King County, Washington
Towns in Washington (state)
Seattle metropolitan area